Route 155 is a north/south highway on the north shore of the Saint Lawrence River in Quebec, Canada. Its northern terminus is in Chambord at the junction of Route 169, and the southern terminus is the Piles Bridge in Shawinigan.  Previously the highway continued to Autoroute 20 but that section was decommissioned in 2006 when Autoroute 55 was completed.

Most of the length of the highway runs in the Mauricie region very close to the Saint-Maurice River on the opposite side of which is the La Mauricie National Park (Parks Canada). Several small bridges and roads connect the park to Highway 155. It is also the main ground transportation route between the Mauricie and Centre-du-Québec regions and the Saguenay–Lac-Saint-Jean.

Municipalities along Route 155

 Shawinigan
 Grandes-Piles
 Saint-Roch-de-Mékinac
 Trois-Rives
 La Tuque
 La Bostonnais
 Lac-Bouchette
 Saint-François-de-Sales
 Chambord

Major intersections

See also
 List of Quebec provincial highways

References

External links 
 Interactive Provincial Route Map (Transports Québec) 
 Route 155 on Google Maps

155
La Tuque, Quebec
Transport in Shawinigan